Cristian Zorzi (born 14 August 1972 in Cavalese, Trentino) is an Italian former cross-country skier who excelled at sprint ski races. He is nicknamed Zorro, for his exuberant character.

Biography
Zorzi's first major success was at the 2000 Cross-Country Skiing World Cup, where he finished in second place. At the 2002 Winter Olympics in Salt Lake City, he won a silver medal in the 4 × 10 km relay and a bronze in the individual sprint.

At the 2006 Winter Olympics in Turin, he was the anchor on the Italian 4 × 10 km relay team that won the gold medal in those games.

Zorzi won two medals at the FIS Nordic World Ski Championships; a gold medal in the team sprint in 2007 and a silver in the individual sprint in 2001. He has also finished second in the 2000–01 Sprint World Cup, which he followed up with a third place in the following 2001–02 season.

Cross-country skiing results
All results are sourced from the International Ski Federation (FIS).

Olympic Games
 3 medals – (1 gold, 1 silver, 1 bronze)

World Championships
 2 medals – (1 gold, 1 silver)

World Cup

Season standings

Individual podiums
5 victories – (5 ) 
12 podiums – (11 , 1 )

Team podiums
 8 victories – (3 , 5 ) 
 19 podiums – (9 , 10 )

References

External links

 
 
 
 

1972 births
Living people
Italian male cross-country skiers
Olympic cross-country skiers of Italy
Olympic gold medalists for Italy
Olympic silver medalists for Italy
Olympic bronze medalists for Italy
Olympic medalists in cross-country skiing
Cross-country skiers at the 2002 Winter Olympics
Cross-country skiers at the 2006 Winter Olympics
Cross-country skiers at the 2010 Winter Olympics
Medalists at the 2002 Winter Olympics
Medalists at the 2006 Winter Olympics
Cross-country skiers of Fiamme Gialle
FIS Nordic World Ski Championships medalists in cross-country skiing
People from Cavalese
Sportspeople from Trentino